The Akron, OH Metropolitan Statistical Area, sometimes referred to as Greater Akron, is defined by the United States Office of Management and Budget as an area consisting of two counties, Summit and Portage, in Northeast Ohio and anchored by the city of Akron. As of the 2020 census, the MSA had a population of 702,219. The Akron MSA is also part of the larger Cleveland–Akron–Canton, OH Combined Statistical Area, which has a population of 3,633,962 people as of the 2020 census, the largest metropolitan area in Ohio.

Historically, Greater Akron was known as the center of the United States' tire and rubber industry throughout the 20th century, and today one major tire company (Goodyear Tire and Rubber) still is based there. More recently, the area has become a center of polymer science research and manufacturing for the country, and is home to five Fortune 1000 corporations.

Communities

Places with more than 100,000 inhabitants 
Akron (principal city) – 190,469

Places with 25,000 to 100,000 inhabitants 

Cuyahoga Falls – 51,114
Stow – 34,483
Kent – 28,215
Green – 27,475
Barberton – 25,191

Places with 10,000 to 25,000 inhabitants 

Aurora – 17,239
Brimfield Township – 10,376
Copley Township – 17,304
Coventry Township – 10,945
Hudson – 22,262
Macedonia – 11,188
New Franklin – 14,227
Norton – 12,081
Portage Lakes (census-designated place)
Ravenna – 11,724
Sagamore Hills Township – 10,947
Springfield Township – 14,644
Streetsboro – 16,028
Tallmadge – 17,257
Twinsburg – 18,795

Places with 5,000 to 10,000 inhabitants 

Bath Township – 9,702
Fairlawn – 7,437
Franklin Township – 5,527
Montrose-Ghent (CDP)
Munroe Falls – 5,012
Northfield Center Township – 5,839
Randolph Township – 5,298
Ravenna Township – 9,209
Richfield Township – 6,165
Rootstown Township – 8,225
Shalersville Township – 5,670
Suffield Township – 6,311

Places with 1,000 to 5,000 inhabitants 

Atwater Township – 2,740
Boston Heights – 1,300
Boston Township – 1,272
Brimfield (CDP)
Charlestown Township – 1,799
Clinton – 1,214
Deerfield Township – 2,822
Edinburg Township – 2,586
Freedom Township – 2,843
Garrettsville – 2,325
Hiram – 1,406
Hiram Township – 2,411
Lakemore – 3,068
Mantua – 1,043
Mantua Township – 4,811
Mogadore – 2,846
Nelson Township – 3,148
Palmyra Township – 2,919
Northfield – 3,677
Paris Township – 1,744
Reminderville – 3,404
Richfield
Silver Lake – 2,519
Twinsburg Township – 2,828
Windham – 2,209
Windham Township 1,865

Places with less than 1,000 inhabitants 

Brady Lake – 464
Peninsula - 565
Pigeon Creek (CDP)
Sugar Bush Knolls – 177

Unincorporated places 
Diamond
Ghent
Hammond's Corners
Montrose
Wayland

Demographics 

As of the census of 2010, there were 703,200 people, 279,518 households, and 181,540 families residing within the MSA. The racial makeup of the MSA was 84.8% White, 11.9% African American, 0.20% Native American, 1.8% Asian, 0% Pacific Islander, 0.26% from other races, and 1.34% from two or more races. Hispanic or Latino of any race were 1.2% of the population. 3.4% of the population were reported as foreign born, and 5.4% reported speaking a language other than English as the primary language in the home. In the MSA the population was spread out, with 18.7% the age of 14 or under, 14.4% from 15 to 24, 25.7% from 25 to 44, 27.6% from 45 to 64, and 13.5% who were 65 years of age or older. For every 100 females, there were 94.1 males.

The median family income in 2007 dollars in the MSA was $61,537, and the median household income in the MSA was $47,336. Males had a median income of $38,776 versus $26,532 for females. The per capita income for the MSA was $36,564 in 2007 dollars.

Economy 
, the Akron metropolitan area serves as the corporate headquarters of 5 Fortune 1000 firms (shown with 2006 rankings below):
 (#112) Goodyear Tire and Rubber Company (Akron, rubber)
 (#184) FirstEnergy (Akron, utilities)
 (#671) Diebold (Green, electronics)
 (#839) Jo Ann Stores (Hudson, specialty retailer)
 (#995) A. Schulman (Fairlawn, chemicals)

Other large employers include:

 Acme Fresh Market (Akron, grocery chain)
 Advanced Elastomer Systems (Akron, polymers)
 Babcock & Wilcox (Barberton, engineering)
 Bridgestone Corporation (Akron, rubber)
 Davey Tree Expert Company (Kent, tree and lawn care)
 East Manufacturing Corp (Randolph Township, manufacturing)
 FedEx Corporation (Green, logistics)
 FirstMerit (Akron, banking)
 GE Lighting (Ravenna, manufacturing)
 Gojo Industries (Akron, chemicals)
 Hiram College (Hiram, higher education)
 Huntington Bancshares (Multiple Sites in MSA, banking)
 InfoCision Management Corporation (Bath Township, teleservice)
 JPMorgan Chase Bank (Multiple Sites in MSA, banking)
 Kent State University (Kent, higher education)
 KeyBank (Multiple Sites in MSA, banking)
 Little Tikes (Hudson, children's toys)
 Lockheed Martin (Akron, aerospace/defense/security)
 McMaster-Carr (Aurora, maintenance/repair/operations)
 Myers Industries (Akron, polymers)
 PNC Financial Services (Multiple Sites in MSA, banking)
 PPG Industries (Barberton, chemicals)
 Roadway Express (Akron, logistics)
 Saint Gobain (Multiple Sites in MSA, polymers/aerospace)
 Sterling Jewelers (Akron, specialty jewelry)
 Step2 Corporation (Streetsboro, children's toys)
 Summa Health System (Akron, health care)
 Summit Racing Equipment (Tallmadge, racing equipment)
 Time Warner Cable (Akron, cable television)
 University of Akron (Akron, higher education)

Transportation

Airports 
The Akron metropolitan area is served by the following international, regional and county airports:
 Akron–Canton Regional Airport (Green)
 Akron Fulton International Airport (Akron)
 Kent State University Airport (Stow)
 Portage County Regional Airport (Shalersville Township)

Highways 

 Interstate 76
 Interstate 77
  Interstate 80 (Ohio Turnpike)
 Interstate 271
 Interstate 277
 Interstate 480
 U.S. Route 224
 U.S. Route 422
 Ohio State Route 5
 Ohio State Route 8
 Ohio State Route 14
 Ohio State Route 18
 Ohio State Route 21
 Ohio State Route 43
 Ohio State Route 44
 Ohio State Route 59
 Ohio State Route 82
 Ohio State Route 88
 Ohio State Route 91
 Ohio State Route 93
 Ohio State Route 162
 Ohio State Route 183
 Ohio State Route 225
 Ohio State Route 241
 Ohio State Route 261
 Ohio State Route 282
 Ohio State Route 303
 Ohio State Route 305
 Ohio State Route 306
 Ohio State Route 532
 Ohio State Route 619
 Ohio State Route 700

Public transit 
In Summit County, public transportation is available through the METRO Regional Transit Authority system, which has a fleet of over two hundred buses and trolleys and operates local routes as well as running commuter buses into downtown Cleveland. The Portage Area Regional Transportation Authority (PARTA) operates throughout Portage County and also runs an express route connecting the University of Akron with Kent State University.

Education 

University of Akron, located in Akron; a large regional public research university with about 15,000 students. It serves as Summit County's largest university and one of the largest employers.
Kent State University, located in Kent; a large regional public research university with about 35,000 students.  It serves as Portage County's largest university and employer.
Hiram College, located in Hiram in northwestern Portage County; a small liberal arts college of around 1,200 students.
The Northeast Ohio Medical University (NEOMED), located in Rootstown, in the south-central part of the county.  It serves students from Kent State University, the University of Akron, Youngstown State University, and Cleveland State University.

Media

Print
The Akron area is served in print by the daily Akron Beacon Journal, formerly the flagship newspaper of the Knight Newspapers chain; the weekly "The Akron Reporter"; and the weekly West Side Leader newspapers and the monthly magazine Akron Life. The Buchtelite newspaper is published by the University of Akron.

TV
Akron is part of the Cleveland-Akron-Canton TV market, the 18th largest market in the U.S. Within the market, WEAO (PBS), WVPX (ION), and WBNX-TV (independent) are licensed to Akron.  However, while WEAO serves the city of Akron specifically, WBNX and WVPX identify themselves as Akron/Cleveland, serving the entire market. Akron has no native news broadcast, having lost its only news station when the former WAKC became WVPX in 1996. WVPX and Cleveland's WKYC later provided a joint news program, which was cancelled in 2005.

Radio

While part of a combined TV market with Cleveland, the Akron area is its own radio market, and served by WZIP 88.1 (Top 40 – University of Akron), WSTB 88.9 (alternative), WKSU 89.7 (public radio), WAPS 91.3 (album adult alternative), WKJA 91.9 (religious), WQMX 94.9 (country), WONE 97.5 (classic rock), WKDD 98.1 (contemporary hits), WNIR-FM 100.1 (news/talk), WHLO 640 (news/talk), WCUE 1150 (religious), and WAKR 1590/93.5 (soft adult contemporary/full service).

Culture

Theaters and concert venues 

 Actors' Summit (Akron)
 Akron Civic Theater (Akron)
 ANTIC Theatre (Cuyahoga Falls)
 Aurora Community Theatre (Aurora)
 Blossom Music Center (Cuyahoga Falls)
 E. J. Thomas Hall (Akron)
 Highland Theater (Akron)
 Kent Stage (Kent)
 Lock 3 (Akron)
 Magical Theatre (Barberton)
 Musica (Akron)
 Porthouse Theatre (Cuyahoga Falls))
 Weathervane Playhouse (Akron)

Museums and historic landmarks 

 Akron Art Museum (Akron)
 Aurora Historical Society Museum (Aurora)
 Cuyahoga Valley Historical Museum (Peninsula)
 Dr. Bob's Home (Akron)
 Hale Farm & Village (Bath Township)
 Hower House (Akron)
 Kent State School of Art Galleries (Kent)
 Kent State University Museum (Kent)
 Kelso House Museum (Brimfield)
 Lowrie-Beatty Museum (Ravenna)
 Myers School of Art Galleries (Akron)
 Perkins Stone Mansion (Akron)
 Stan Hywet Hall and Gardens (Akron, Ohio)
 Twinsburg Historical Society (Twinsburg)

Parks and recreation

National parks

Cuyahoga Valley National Park 
Cuyahoga Valley National Park is a national park located in Summit County and lies between the major Ohio cities of Cleveland and Akron.  It is the only national park located in Ohio and consists of over 33,000 acres. Waterfalls, rolling hills, caves, winding river scenery attract many park visitors.  Over 125 miles of trails traverse the steep narrow ravines, rolling floodplain, and lush farmland throughout the park.  The park offers an array of preserved and restored displays of 19th (see Hale Farm & Village) and early 20th century sustainable farming and pastoral, rural living, while catering to contemporary interests with art exhibits, outdoor concerts, and scenic excursion and special event railroad tours on the Cuyahoga Valley Scenic Railroad.

County-wide park districts

Summit Metro Parks 
The Freedom Trail is currently under construction, with phases one and two already complete. Phases one and two pass through Tallmadge, Munroe Falls, and Akron, and connect with the western end of the Portage Hike and Bike Trail in Kent. Phase three will connect the Freedom Trail to the Towpath Trail in downtown Akron.

The Ohio and Erie Canal Towpath Trail 
The Ohio and Erie Canal Towpath Trail in Summit County follows the course of the former Ohio and Erie Canal.  When the trail is fully complete, it will stretch about 100 miles from Downtown Cleveland in Cuyahoga County, though the Cuyahoga Valley National Park and Summit County, Stark County and end in New Philadelphia in Tuscarawas County. In 2011, Summit County became the first of the counties to complete their section of the Towpath Trail stretching 33.4 miles from the Portage Lakes in the southern portion of the county, through the suburbs and downtown Akron, and finally through the Cuyahoga Valley National Park.

Portage Park District 
Notable trails include the Headwater Trail which follows the former Cleveland and Mahoning Valley Railroad line and connects Mantua and Garrettsville. The Portage Hike and Bike Trail has several phases completed in and around Kent and Ravenna, with direct connections to the Freedom and Bike and Hike Trails in Summit County.

State parks and nature reserves

Nelson Kennedy Ledges State Park 
Nelson Kennedy Ledges State Park is a 167-acre state park located near Garrettsville in Portage County. The spectacular rock formations at Nelson-Kennedy Ledges have become trademarks of the park. These rock formations are among the few outcrops in northern Ohio still exposed to view and offer hiking trails ranging from easy to difficult. Activities located in the park include hiking and picnicking.

Portage Lakes State Park 
Portage Lakes State Park is a 2,475 acre state park located in Akron around the Portage Lakes.  There are approximately 2034 acres of water and 8 lakes within the park that can be used for boating, fishing, and swimming and an additional 411 acres of land that can be used for camping, hunting, and picnicking.

Tinker's Creek State Park 
Tinkers Creek State Park is a 370-acre state park located in Streetsboro in Portage County. Park activities include fishing on a 15-acre spring-fed lake, picnicking, hiking, and cross country skiing and ice fishing during winter.

West Branch State Park 
West Branch State Park is an 8,002 acre state park located near Ravenna in Portage County.  The large 2,650-acre lake can be used for boating, fishing, and swimming and contains numerous boat launches.  The 5,379-acres of meadows and woodlots can be used for numerous activities such as for camping, hiking, hunting and horseback riding. The park maintains 14 miles of hiking trails, 12 miles of mountain biking trails, and 20 miles of bridle trails.

Wingfoot Lake State Park 
Wingfoot Lake State Park is a 690-acre state park located in Mogadore in Portage County around Wingfoot Lake.  The park was built in the 1960s by the Goodyear Tire and Rubber Company for their employees and corporate retreats. In 2009, the park was bought by the Ohio Department of Natural Resources, Division of Wildlife.  Facilities include enclosed and open pavilion shelters (some with fireplaces), playgrounds, badminton courts, horseshoe pits, bocce ball courts, an 18-hole mini-golf course, and an 18-hole disc golf course.  Boating and fishing is also permitted on the 444 acre Wingfoot Lake.

Public nature reserves 
 Aurora Sanctuary State Nature Preserve – a 164-acre nature preserve located in Aurora.
 Eagle Creek State Nature Preserve – a 472-acre nature preserve located in Garrettsville.
 Herrick Fen – a 127-acre nature preserve located near Streetsboro.
 Tom S. Cooperrider-Kent Bog State Nature Preserve – a 42-acre nature preserve located in Kent.
 Marsh Wetlands – a 152-acre nature preserve located near Mantua.
 Novak (Blanche Katherine) Sanctuary – a 152-acre nature preserve located in Aurora.
 Portage Lakes Wetland State Nature Preserve – a 6-acre nature preserve located in Akron.
 Tinker's Creek State Nature Preserve – a 786-acre nature preserve located in Aurora.
 Triangle Lake Bog State Nature Preserve – a 61-acre nature reserve located in Rootstown.
 Tummonds State Nature Preserve – an 86-acre nature reserve located near Mantua.

See also
Ohio census statistical areas

References

 
Metropolitan areas of Ohio